Shakhenat District is in Birjand County, South Khorasan province, Iran. At the 2006 National Census, the region's population (as a part of the Central District) was 9,381 in 2,695 households. The following census in 2011 counted 8,039 people in 2,572 households. At the latest census in 2016, the district had 7,966 inhabitants in 2,617 households. After the census, Shakhen and Shakhenat Rural Districts were separated from the Central District to establish Shakhenat District.

References 

Birjand County

Districts of South Khorasan Province

Populated places in South Khorasan Province

Populated places in Birjand County

fa:بخش شاخنات